Ferdinand Karapetian (born 19 December 1992) is an Armenian judoka. He competes in the -73 kg weight category and won a gold medal in the 2018 European Championships. He represented Armenia at the 2020 Summer Olympics.

References

External links
 
 
 

1992 births
Armenian male judoka
Living people
European Games competitors for Armenia
Judoka at the 2019 European Games
Judoka at the 2020 Summer Olympics
Olympic judoka of Armenia
21st-century Armenian people